Dennis Melland is an American curler,  and a 1971 United States men's curling champion.

Teams

Personal life
His brother Rodney is also a curler and Dennis' teammate.

References

External links
 

Living people
American male curlers
World curling champions
American curling champions
Year of birth missing (living people)